Shinee World V (promoted as SHINee Concert "SHINee World V") is the fifth concert tour by South Korean boy group, Shinee. The tour kicked off in Seoul with three concerts held between September 2–4, 2016.

History

Seoul
SM Entertainment confirmed on July 22, 2016, that Shinee would be kicking off their fifth concert tour, Shinee World V, in September 2016. Originally, there were to be two concerts held on September 3 and 4 at the Olympic Gymnastics Arena in Seoul, but a third was added for September 2 after heavy demand for ticketing. All tickets for the first two shows sold out in under five minutes. The set list for the concert focused on songs both old and new, and featured the first performances of four songs from their fifth album, 1 of 1. The songs included: "Prism", "Feel Good", "Don't Let Me Go" and "So Amazing". They also previewed the dance and a sound sample of their promotional title track, "1 of 1". During the September 4 concert, member Onew sprained his ankle during a performance which led to Shinee's comeback being delayed by a few weeks. The three concerts drew in an estimated 30,000 fans.

Yokohama
On September 30, it was confirmed that Shinee would be holding three concerts in Yokohama, Japan at Yokohama Arena between December 9–11. This marked the first time that a concert was held in Japan outside of their arena tours since their first solo concert tour in 2010, Shinee World. The concerts drew in an estimated 45,000 fans.

Dallas and Los Angeles
On January 26, it was revealed that SubKulture Entertainment would be bringing Shinee to the United States for their first ever solo concerts in the country. The two concerts were held in Dallas and Los Angeles. The concerts each drew a "full house" with each stop drawing in crowds of over 6,000.

Toronto and Vancouver
On February 1, it was revealed that KPOPME would be bringing Shinee to Canada for their first ever solo concerts in the country. The two concerts were held in Toronto and Vancouver.

Hong Kong
On February 3, it was confirmed that Shinee would be holding a concert in Hong Kong on May 20. This marked their first time performing a solo concert in Hong Kong since their second concert tour in 2012, Shinee World II.

Bangkok Thailand
On May 8, 2017, SM True Thailand confirmed that Shinee would hold a concert in Bangkok on June 24, 2017, at Thunder Dome MuangThong Thani. It was the last concert stop for Shinee World V.

Set list

Schedule

References

External links
SM Entertainment – Official website
Shinee – Official South Korean website

Shinee concert tours
2016 concert tours
2017 concert tours